Konterra is an unincorporated area and census-designated place (CDP) in Prince George's County, Maryland, United States. The population was 3,158 at the 2020 census.

Parts of Konterra were previously defined by the U.S. Census Bureau as being in the West Laurel census-designated place.

Geography

Konterra is located in northern Prince George's County, around the interchange of Interstate 95 and Maryland Route 200. The city of Laurel borders the CDP to the northeast. West Laurel lies to the north, and South Laurel is to the east. Beltsville is to the south, and Calverton is to the southwest. To the northwest, in Montgomery County, is Burtonsville.

Demographics

2020 census

Note: the US Census treats Hispanic/Latino as an ethnic category. This table excludes Latinos from the racial categories and assigns them to a separate category. Hispanics/Latinos can be of any race.

Education
The residents are zoned to schools of Prince George's County Public Schools. Zoned schools serving sections of the CDP include:

Elementary schools:
 Bond Mill Elementary School in West Laurel
 Vansville Elementary School in an unincorporated area

The sole zoned middle school serving the CDP is Martin Luther King Middle School in Beltsville.

High schools:
 Laurel High School in Laurel
 High Point High School in Beltsville

References

Census-designated places in Prince George's County, Maryland
Census-designated places in Maryland